Ramón Solis (born 8 July 1960) is a Filipino weightlifter. He has represented the Philippines internationally from 1975 to 1998. He won several medals in the Southeast Asian Games from 1977 to 1997. He won gold medals in 1981, 1983, 1985, 1987, 1989 and 1991 in the Southeast Asian Games. He competed in the men's middle heavyweight event at the 1988 Summer Olympics. He has also competed at the 1998 Asian Games in the men's 105 kg event.

Solis is also the head coach for the Philippine weightlifting team multiple times with his latest tenure as coach starting in August 2019. He has coached the national weightlifting team at the Southeast Asian Games in four occasions with the first being the 2005 edition and  the 2019 edition being the last. Among the weightlifters he coached includes Olympians Hidilyn Diaz and Elreen Ando. He also has coached the varsity weightlifting teams of the University of Cebu and the University of San Jose-Recoletos.

He is also among the coaches involved in the selection of weightlifters that represented that Philippines at the 2017 Summer Universiade in Taipei.

References

External links
 

1960 births
Living people
Filipino male weightlifters
Olympic weightlifters of the Philippines
Weightlifters at the 1988 Summer Olympics
Sportspeople from Cebu
Weightlifters at the 1998 Asian Games
Asian Games competitors for the Philippines
Southeast Asian Games gold medalists for the Philippines
Southeast Asian Games competitors for the Philippines
Southeast Asian Games medalists in weightlifting
Southeast Asian Games silver medalists for the Philippines
Southeast Asian Games bronze medalists for the Philippines
20th-century Filipino people